The Ngapouri-Rotomahana Fault is a seismically and volcanically active area of the central North Island of New Zealand.

Geology

Coming from the south the Ngapouri-Rotomahana Fault can be interpreted as a splay of the Paeroa Fault beneath the still geothermally active volcano of Maungaongaonga which defines the most western aspect of the Okataina Volcanic Centre at the eastern margin of the Taupō Rift of the Taupō Volcanic Zone. Between the two active south-east dipping faults is a short segment of fault that is atypically north-west dipping and at 90 degrees to the rift zone axis. Since however the Taupō Rift itself takes a 20 degree change of direction to the south and the dominant rift widening is actually in the Bay of Plenty and has decreased by half to a displacement rate of 7.2 ± 0.4 mm/yr at this part of the rift system other interpretations might be more logical. Certainly there is a discontinuity, associated with the Okataina Volcanic Centre between the south-east dipping intra-rift normal Edgecumbe Fault that currently defines the main eastern intra-rift fault in the Bay of Plenty part of the Taupō Rift and the south-east dipping intra-rift northern segment of the Ngapouri-Rotomahana Fault, the Rotomahana Fault. This transitions into the Ngapouri Fault (its southern segment) and this then intersects the Paeroa Fault, with the last part of the intersection having a completely different orientation.

Risks
Complete rupture of this intra-rift fault occurred just before one major recent volcanic event, being the 1314±12 CE Kaharoa eruption of Mount Tarawera and was associated in time with multiple large hydrothermal eruptions to the south of the Ngapouri Fault that created craters on the southern slopes of Maunga Kākaramea (Rainbow Mountain) and around Lakes Ngāpouri (Opouri) and Tutaeinanga and covered that locality with hydrothermal mud. On the 14 December 1983 there was a shallow magnitude 5.1 shock, on or close to the Ngapouri fault, near Waiotapu which did a moderate amount of property damage.

References

Seismic faults of New Zealand
Taupō Volcanic Zone
Okataina Volcanic Centre